Sarbeswar Mohanty (1 July 1944 - 16 May 2021) was an Indian Administrative Service officer of Odisha cadre.
He had served as Commissioner cum Secretary, Labour & Employment Department, Government of Odisha, Secretary, Odisha Legislative Assembly,
and Director, Information & Public Relations Department, Government of Odisha.
He had served as District Magistrate of 3 different districts Jagatsinghpur,
Khordha, and Kendrapara of the state of Odisha, India.
National Human Rights Commission of India placed on record its appreciation of the sincerity, dedication and commitment displayed by him as the Collector of Jagatsinghpur district in organising and executing relief and rehabilitation work post super cyclone that struck Odisha in October 1999.

He was the President of the governing bodies of Alaka Mahavidyalaya. and Loknath Mohavidyalaya
He also worked as managing editor of Odia magazine Nabarabi.

References 

1944 births
2021 deaths
People from Bhubaneswar
People from Bhadrak district
Indian Administrative Service officers
District magistrate